Saint Joseph Atoll is part of the Amirante Islands group, which are in the Outer Islands (Coralline Seychelles) coral archipelago of the Seychelles islands and nation. The atoll is located southwest of the granitic Inner Seychelles archipelago, with a distance of 248 km south of Victoria, Seychelles.

History
The atoll was discovered in 1770 by European sailors.
Private atoll
In 1960, The island became the property of a Seychellois family, who built a coconut plantation on the bigger St. Joseph island. 
Nature preserve
In August 2012 it was revealed that the atoll was sold, together with D'Arros Island, for US$60 million, to be managed by the Save Our Seas Foundation.

Geography
The land area of the Atoll occupies .
The tree tops are about 24 m high.

Coral reefs
Its total area is 22.53 km2, of which 11.74 km2 comprises the peripheral reef flat, 4.8 km2 the interior lagoon, and only 1.39 km2 the land area of all islets. 
Depths of 500 m are found only 1.5 km east of the reef edge, and of 1000 m one kilometer further east.

Lagoon
The lagoon is completely enclosed by the surrounding reef. At low water it drains over a narrow sill, Passe Lerein Fin, at its western end. The lagoon has a maximum depth of 6.4 m. Other soundings range from 2.1 to 3.7 m. The peripheral reefs, in addition to being exceptionally wide, are covered (except on the west side) with mobile sand. Inter-tidal sand sheets are encroaching on the margins of the lagoon on  its windward side, which is marked for much of its extent by a discontinuous linear sandbar. There are no growing reefs in the lagoon.

List of islets
The atoll has 13 sandy islets: the three larger ones along the northeast and east shore, which are covered by coconut plantations, and the remaining ones in the south:

Administration
The island belongs to Outer Islands District.

Demographics
The atoll is currently uninhabited. 
it hosted a small population of 10, which now moved to D'Arros Island. There are several ruined buildings on the main island of St. Joseph, near the cultivated area at the western end.

Transport
You can reach the atoll with flights to unpaved airstrip .

Image gallery

References

External links 

 Island guide 1
 Island guide 2
 National Bureau of Statistics
 Info on the island

Nature reserves
Atolls of Seychelles
Outer Islands (Seychelles)